Olympia Club de Bruxelles was a Brussels-based Belgian football club that existed between its creation in 1897 until 1909. It appeared briefly at the top level during the 1903–04 season, finishing 5th out of 7, before withdrawing from the League at the end of the season.

Olympia Club de Bruxelles brand acquired by Global Sports Consulting Limited in 2017

See also
 Belgian football clubs history
 RSSSF Archive – 1st and 2nd division final tables

Association football clubs established in 1897
Olympia Club
Association football clubs disestablished in 1909
1897 establishments in Belgium
1909 disestablishments in Belgium
Defunct football clubs in Belgium
Belgian Pro League clubs